Nanda Parbat  is a fictional city in the DC Comics universe. It first appeared in Strange Adventures #216 (February 1969), created by Neal Adams.

History
Nanda Parbat is a hidden city nestled high in the mountains of Hindu Kush. It is said to be a place of healing and enlightenment watched over by the goddess-like figure Rama Kushna and her monks. As in Shangri-La, time moves differently in Nanda Parbat; one can leave the city to find that less time has passed in the outside world.

Rama Kushna is most famous as the entity responsible for turning aerialist Boston Brand into the ghostly Deadman. As her spiritual agent, Brand wanders the Earth possessing the bodies of the living and doing good works, in the hopes of finding eventual access to paradise. Deadman has returned to Nanda Parbat on occasion to defend it against attackers such as The Sensei of the League of Assassins, an aged warrior at one time possessed by Jonah, another of Rama's former agents.

Invisible map
A map had been used to reach this place in the story arc The Resurrection of Ra's al Ghul written by Grant Morrison and Paul Dini. The so-called "invisible map" is supposedly composed of seven pieces, including a tattoo, a scrap of parchment, a poem and a birthmark.

Notable appearances
Rama Kushna and Nanda Parbat have also played a role in the lives of other DC Comics characters:
 Nanda Parbat was home to Judomaster prior to his joining the team known as the L.A.W. It is responsible for him remaining as youthful as he was in the 1940s.
 The Crimson Avenger spent time in Nanda Parbat, seeking meaning in the senseless acts of violence he witnessed in World War I. During his convalescence, he received a vision of the future and witnessed the death of Superman (as depicted in Golden Age Secret Files #1).
 During a visit to Nanda Parbat, Deadman briefly returned to his human form and was infected by the Sensei with a poison that rendered him suggestible. When he returned to his ghostly state, one of Sensei's men sent Deadman to attack Batman while Sensei and the League prepared to destroy Nanda Parbat. Batman was able to convince Deadman to lead him and Boston's brother Cleve to Nanda Parbat, and Batman and Cleve saved the city and discovered the antidote for the poison.
 In 52, Nanda Parbat is where The Question takes Renee Montoya to be trained by martial arts master Richard Dragon. It is just outside Nanda Parbat that the Question dies of complications from lung disease.
 Later in 52, Ralph Dibny journeys to Nanda Parbat, seeking an audience with Rama Kushna and a way to resurrect his late wife, Sue. A member of the Great Ten, the Accomplished Perfect Physician, is also shown seeking inner peace in the hidden city.
 In Batman #663, Batman uses a mantra or prayer he learned in Nanda Parbat over a dead man. In the same issue he enters the state of Nirvikalpa Samadhi, using a technique learned in Nanda Parbat, to find the hidden or occult pattern to the Joker's recent murders.
 In Reign in Hell, Deadman, Zachary Zatara, Jason Blood, Kid Devil and Randu went to Nanda Parbat trying to help Rama Kushna balance the good and evil forces.
 In Blackest Night, Deadman tries to recover his own body in Nanda Parbat but is rejected several times, so he uses other Black Lanterns' bodies trying to discover how to use his own body and how to destroy the Black Lanterns. Phantom Stranger helps him and they enter Nanda Parbat.
 In Brightest Day, Saint Walker and Renee Montoya held Charles Victor Szasz's funeral in Nanda Parbat.
 In Detective Comics Annual #12, Renee Montoya goes to Nanda Parbat trying to get rid of the Mark of Cain, while Richard Dragon let her go to Penemue who tried to get the mark for himself.
 In Superman: Grounded, Part Eight, the city is mentioned in a flashback depicting Clark Kent and Bruce Wayne's first meeting with each other during the period when both are travelling the world prior to assuming their costumed identities, dealing with Vandal Savage and his attempt to find Nanda Parbat, referred to as "The Shifting City".
 In Justice League Dark #13, the Books of Magic are hidden in Nanda Parbat, which Faust and Dr. Mist acknowledge as a place of great power. Brand also mentions that he's already been there.

In other media

Television
 In the episode "Dead Reckoning" of the Justice League Unlimited television show, Batman reveals that he studied with a martial arts master in a monastery in Nanda Parbat, when Deadman enlists his help—along with Superman and Wonder Woman—to avenge the martial arts master's murder. It is seen that all the monks died due to the Secret Society of Super Villains, but they are revived after members of the Justice League stop the villains' plans.
 Nanda Parbat appears in the Arrowverse:
 In Arrow it is mentioned in the first season as the place where Malcolm Merlyn found the "purpose for [his] life" following his wife's murder. The League of Assassins plays a major role in season two, where they enter Starling City to locate former member Sara Lance. Ra's al Ghul serves as the main antagonist of the third season with Nanda Parbat appearing prominently, established as being somewhere in the Hindu Kush range in Pakistan, built into a cliff in a desert. It is also a location for one of the Lazarus Pits, which Ra's and other League members use to prolong their life. The sixteenth episode of the season is titled "Nanda Parbat". In season four, Laurel Lance and Thea Queen travel to Nanda Parbat to request Merlyn (as the new Ra's al Ghul) to resurrect Sara with the Lazarus Pit. Sara's girlfriend Nyssa al Ghul is enraged by the resurrection and destroys the Lazarus Pit, resulting in a League civil war. After Oliver Queen defeats Merlyn on behalf of Nyssa, she declines the League's leadership and instead disbands it, not wanting to be like her father. Due to this, the League's lair in Nanda Parbat appears to be empty after their disbandment.
 In the season one episode "Left Behind" of Legends of Tomorrow, Sara Lance returns to Nanda Parbat after she is stranded in 1958. Two years later, she is recovered by the rest of the team.
 Nanda Parbat appears (though it is not referred to as such) in season 3 of the TV series Gotham, in which Bruce Wayne is held captive there by the Sensei after being kidnapped by the Court of Owls. In season 4, it is revealed that Ra's al Ghul is the Minister of Antiquities for Nanda Parbat, a status he exploits to invoke diplomatic immunity after being arrested in Gotham City.

Film
In Batman: Soul of the Dragon, students of O-Sensei: Shiva, Rip Jagger, Richard Dragon, Jade, Ben Turner, and Bruce Wayne are stationed in Nanda Parbat. It is also the home of a gateway that the villains Kobra plan to unleash their god, Nāga from his prison.

Video games
 Nanda Parbat appears in DC Universe Online.
 Nanda Parbat appears in Lego DC Super-Villains, where Ra's al Ghul and Deathstroke are encountered by the Joker, Batman and the Flash.

References

External links
DCU Guide: Rama Kushna
DCU Guide: Taj Ze

1969 in comics
Fictional elements introduced in 1969
DC Comics populated places